Hualien County is represented in the Legislative Yuan since 2008 by one at-large single-member constituency (Hualien County Constituency).

Current district
 Hualien County

Legislators

 Fu Kun-chi resigned in 2009 after his election as Hualien County magistrate.

Election results

2020

2016

References 

Constituencies in Taiwan
Hualien County